Hole-In-One Golf is a 1986 video game published by Artworx.

Gameplay
Hole-In-One Golf is a game in which a utility is included to create courses that can be saved to blank disks.

Reception
Rick Teverbaugh reviewed the game for Computer Gaming World, and stated that "What you wouldn't expect out of a $9.95 program is a game system that enables you to do something that no other golf game attempts and that is to undercut the ball and actually get a backup when it lands."

References

External links
Review in Commodore Microcomputers

1986 video games
Artworx games
Commodore 64 games
Commodore 64-only games
Golf video games
Video games developed in the United States